Natingero is an Aboriginal Australian language of Western Australia.  It has been listed as a dialect of Kalaamaya, but is only 40% lexically similar.

References

Nyungic languages